Lee Kyung-Chul (Hangul: 이경철) is a South Korean archer who won the 1995 World Archery Championships in Jakarta.

References

South Korean male archers
World Archery Championships medalists
20th-century South Korean people
21st-century South Korean people